The 1977 Seattle Seahawks season was the team's second campaign in the National Football League (NFL). The 1977 season was the team's first in the AFC West (the conference swap was part of the NFL's expansion plan that saw both the Seahawks and Tampa Bay Buccaneers play every other team in the NFL in their first two seasons; the Seahawks would return to the NFC West in 2002). The Seahawks lost five of their first six games. On October 30, the Seahawks earned their second win of the season when quarterback Jim Zorn returned from an injury and threw four touchdown passes in a 56–17 win over the Buffalo Bills at the Kingdome. Two weeks later, the team recorded its first shutout, beating the New York Jets 17–0 in New York. The Seahawks would go on to finish with a 5–9 record, winning their final two games in the process; it was a three-game improvement from the inaugural season.

1977 NFL Draft

Personnel

Staff

Final roster

     Starters in bold.

Schedule

Preseason

Source: Seahawks Media Guides

Regular season
In its second year, Seattle played all of the teams in the AFC as a member of the AFC West.

Bold indicates division opponents.
Source: 1977 NFL season results

Standings

Game summaries

Preseason

Week P1: at San Francisco 49ers

Week P2: vs. Dallas Cowboys

Week P3: vs. Oakland Raiders

Week P4: vs. Detroit Lions

Week P5: vs. Denver Broncos

Week P6: at San Diego Chargers

Regular season

Week 1: vs. Baltimore Colts

Week 2: at Cincinnati Bengals

Week 3: vs. Denver Broncos

Week 4: at New England Patriots

Week 5: vs. Tampa Bay Buccaneers

Week 6: at Miami Dolphins

Week 7: vs. Buffalo Bills

Week 8: at Oakland Raiders

Week 9: at New York Jets

Week 10: vs. Houston Oilers

Week 11: vs. San Diego Chargers

Week 12: at Pittsburgh Steelers

Week 13: at Kansas City Chiefs

Week 14: vs. Cleveland Browns

References

External links
 Seahawks draft history at NFL.com
 1977 NFL season results at NFL.com

Seattle
Seattle Seahawks seasons